LinOTP is Linux-based software to manage authentication devices for two-factor authentication with one time passwords. 
It is implemented as a web service based on the python framework Pylons. Thus it requires a web server to 
run in.

LinOTP is mainly developed by the German company KeyIdentity GmbH. Its core components are licensed under the Affero General Public License.

It is an open source authentication server certified
by the OATH initiative for open authentication for its 2.4 version.

Overview 

As a web service LinOTP provides a REST-like web API. All functions can be accessed via Pylons controllers. 
Responses are returned as a JSON object.

LinOTP is designed in a modular way enabling user store modules and token modules. Thus it is capable of supporting a wide range of different tokens.

Features 

 Supported tokens:
 SafeNet eToken Pass
 SafeNet Safeword Alpine
 mOTP
 Lost token
 Paper token
 Feitian C-100 (HOTP)
 Feitian]] C-200 (TOTP)
 Feitian C-300 (OCRA)
 Feitian c601 (optical OCRA)
 Authenex A-Key V 3.6
 Yubico Yubikey
 Gemalto Ezio Token
 Smartdisplayer
 NagraID 106/103
 NagraID 306 (OCRA)
 BR Token SafeSIGNATURE
 LSE Simple Pass token
 LSE Remote Token
 LSE Radius Token
 LSE Tagespasswort Token
 Apps for iPhone and Android like the Google Authenticator
 Any HOTP/ TOTP and OCRA Token
 Yubikey mass enrollment via CLI
 support for token databases like sqlite, mysql, postgresql, oracle, db2
 management via web interface or command line client
 Users stored in flat files 
 PAM module
 SAML
 OpenID
 FreeRADIUS connection via rlm_perl
 Selfservice
 Import of XML Token files
 Management functions:
 enroll/assign tokens
 synchronize, resynchronize, automatic resychronization
 activate/deactivate/delete tokens
 autoassignment
 lost token scenario
 find token by OTP value
 get OTP value
 Detailed Policies Definitions
 Sophisticated Audit API
 Multitenancy

Source Code 

Being written in Python the program itself comes as the source code.

Project web site
[]

See also 

One-time password
Tokens
TOTP
HOTP
Multi-factor authentication
OTPW
privacyIDEA
OPIE Authentication System
Google Authenticator
Pylons project
Comparison of TOTP applications

References

Authentication methods
Applications of cryptography
Access control
Computer access control
Linux
Software using the GNU AGPL license